The 2007 North Alabama Lions football team represented the University of North Alabama as a member of the Gulf South Conference (GSC) during the 2007 NCAA Division II football season. Led by Mark Hudspeth in his sixth and final year as head coach, the Lions compiled an overall record of 10–2 with a conference mark of 7–1, tying for second place in the GSC. The qualified for the NCAA Division II Football Championship playoffs, where they beat GSC champion  in the second round before falling to conference foe and eventual national champion  Valdosta State in the quarterfinals.

Schedule

Game summaries

Tusculum

Harding

Southern Arkansas

Arkansas Tech

Ouachita Baptist

Arkansas-Monticello

Delta State

Valdosta State

West Georgia

West Alabama

Delta State

Valdosta State

References

North Alabama
North Alabama Lions football seasons
North Alabama Lions football